Julie Dolan  is a pioneering Australian women's soccer player who appeared in eighteen international matches for the Australian Women's National Team during a 10-year career. She debuted in a national representative side aged just fourteen and was the first captain of the  Australian Team

Career 
Dolan was raised in Sydney's Sutherland Shire and started playing football at an elite level aged 13. She played for the Sydney clubs of St George Budapest, Marconi Stallions, Gymea Bay, Ballina, Sutherland, Grange Thistle and Arncliffe Scots. She participated in Australian teams that contested the first Asian Cup in 1975 and the inaugural Women's World Invitational in Chinese Taipei in 1978.

Between 1979 and 1988 Dolan played in eighteen full internationals. She was Australian captain on six occasions and made a total of thirty-four appearances for the Matildas.

She played in the World Invitational Tournament in Oceania in 1983 and the pilot Women's World Cup in China in 1988. She played in the Australian team that defeated Brazil 1–0 in their first encounter in 1988.

Accolades
In 1988, the Australian Women's Soccer Association created the Julie Dolan Medal in her honour, awarded to the Player of the Year in the Women's National Soccer League, and subsequently in the W-League.
 She was inducted into the Football Federation Australia Hall of Fame in 1999 and received the Queen Elizabeth II Australian Sports Medal.

In 2013, Dolan was named in Football Federation Australia's 1979-89 Team of the Decade as the team's captain. She also had the honour of being presented with Cap Number 1 for the Westfield Matildas, in recognition of her being the first captain in the team's first A-International. was named International Federation of Football History and Statistics Oceania Player of the Century.

In 2016, football became the first major Australian sport to jointly name its prestigious awards event in honour of both a legendary female and male player – the Dolan Warren Awards – with Dolan honoured alongside national men's icon Johnny Warren.

Personal
Dolan resides on the Central Coast of New South Wales. She is currently Football Technical Director at the International Football School.

References

External links
"Rockall wins second Julie Dolan Medal" l Football Federation Australia.  Thursday 3 March 2005.  Retrieved 25 May 2011.
"Simon wins Julie Dolan Medal" Hyundai A-League. Sunday, 6 March 2011. Retrieved 25 May 2011.
"Mariner Michelle Scoops Awards"  FourFourTwo Australian A-League. 7 Dec 2009.  Retrieved 25 May 2011. 
"Rockall Player of the Year" The World Game – SBS. 13 February 2008. Retrieved 25 May 2011.
 FFA Football Hall Of Fame

Australian women's soccer players
Living people
Members of the Order of Australia
Women's association footballers not categorized by position
1961 births
Australia women's international soccer players
Soccer players from Sydney
Sportswomen from New South Wales